Richard Henry Dana III (January 3, 1851 – December 16, 1931) was an American lawyer and civil service reformer.

Life
Dana was born in Cambridge, Massachusetts on January 3, 1851, the son of Richard Henry Dana, Jr. Dana graduated from Harvard University. In 1874, he looked back on those years: "Days in college were happy-go-lucky times, even for the most studious and athletic."

Career
Dana was the author of the Massachusetts Ballot Act of 1888, the first state Australian ballot (secret ballot) act passed in the US.

Dana wrote a substantial biography of his father, Richard Henry Dana, Jr. He became a friend and financial adviser to Hosea Ballou Morse, whom he introduced to Theodore Roosevelt.

He was a major leader of Mugwumps, especially through his editorship of the Civil Service Record. His people took credit for passing the state's 1884 civil service law, which was a stronger version of the  federal Pendleton Act of 1883. Both laws were enacted to limit the effect of political patronage, thus disrupting the spoils system. The goal were improved morality and increased efficiency. It was also designed to contain the rising political power of the Irish Catholics.

He died at his home in Cambridge on December 16, 1931.

Legacy
The papers and photographs of Dana, together with material relating to him collected by his son, Henry Wadsworth Longfellow Dana, and his sister, Elizabeth, are held at the Longfellow House–Washington's Headquarters National Historic Site.
  Some family financial records are held at the Houghton Library, Harvard, these include correspondence between Dana and William Penn Cresson, relating to the Cresson's biography of Francis Dana. A number of letters are in the Abernathy Collections at the Middlebury College library, though these may be by his father.
 A substantial collection of family papers (including 293 bound volumes and 81 boxes) is held at the Massachusetts Historical Society. Family papers are also found at the Arthur and Elizabeth Schlesinger Library.

Personal life 

On January 10, 1878, Dana married Edith Longfellow (1853–1915), the daughter of poet Henry Wadsworth Longfellow. They had four sons, Richard Henry Dana IV and Henry Wadsworth Longfellow Dana, Edmund Trowbridge Dana III, and Allston Dana. After Edith's 1915 death, he remarried Helen Ford Mumford (1865–1934) in 1922.

Ernest Longfellow, Edith's brother, disinherited some of her children for holding socialist and pacifist beliefs. Richard Henry Dana IV was a World War I conscientious objector. Henry "Harry" Wadsworth Longfellow Dana became a gay liberationist, previously aquitted of a 1935 morals arrest. Delia Dana became a socialist and feminist. Frances Appleton Dana de Rahm was more traditional. She befriended Franklin Roosevelt but died in 1933 of suicide.

References

1851 births
1931 deaths
American lawyers
Harvard University alumni
Civil service reform in the United States
Lawyers from Cambridge, Massachusetts
Dana family